
Year 353 BC was a year of the pre-Julian Roman calendar. At the time, it was known as the Year of the Consulship of Peticus and Poplicola (or, less frequently, year 401 Ab urbe condita). The denomination 353 BC for this year has been used since the early medieval period, when the Anno Domini calendar era became the prevalent method in Europe for naming years.

Events 
 By place 
 Persian Empire 
 Mausolus, King and Persian satrap of Caria, dies and is succeeded in 352 BC by Artemisia, his sister and wife.

 Greece 
 The Phocians threaten Thessaly to their north. Philip II of Macedon sees his opportunity to penetrate south.
 Clearchus, the tyrant of Heraclea, a Greek city on the Black Sea, is murdered by some of the city's citizens led by Chion after a reign of twelve years. Most of the conspirators are killed by the tyrant's body-guards upon the spot, while others are captured and put to death. Within a short time, the city falls under the rule of the new tyrant Satyrus, Clearchus' brother.

Births

Deaths 
 Clearchus of Heraclea, tyrant of Heraclea Pontica (assassinated) (b. c. 401 BC)
 Iphicrates, Athenian general (b. c. 418 BC)
 Mausolus, King and Persian satrap of Caria

References